Rookie Historian Goo Hae-ryung is a 2019 South Korean television series starring Shin Se-kyung, in the title role as a free-spirited female historian, and Cha Eun-woo, as a prince working underground as a romance novelist. It is also a fictionalisation of part of the story of the Veritable Records of the Joseon Dynasty and their right to be considered a true history.

The series aired on MBC's Wednesdays and Thursdays at 21:00 KST time slot from July 17 to September 26, 2019, with Netflix carrying the series internationally.

Synopsis
The scenario intertwines two storylines. One of them occurs in a "nowadays" placed in the early 19th century of Joseon. The other occurred twenty years before (white horse year, 1810). The first one is treated lightly, in the Sungkyunkwan Scandal vein, with caricatures , jokes, gimmicks, students fights,  etc. The second one, only depicted by short flash-backs, is about the unjust situation of the rank and file people, and the brutal suppression of anyone who dares to object.

Nowadays, Nokseodang
 In the Joseon Dynasty, women were objectified and undervalued. But free-spirited lady Goo Hae-ryung is brave enough to follow her own view of life. Still single at 26 years old, she focuses on studying and gaining knowledge, and in defending those who are wronged and abused.

Meanwhile, the young and handsome 20-year-old Prince Dowon has been living his life alone at the Nokseodang 綠嶼堂 (green island pavilion). Isolated inside the Huwon Garden, he has to stay away from the royal Court and finds comfort by writing hangul romance novels. Published under the pen name Maehwa 梅花 (plum blossom), these novels become famous all over Hanyang, especially to women readers.

The two main characters meet, and this first meeting sparks a war of preferences. But politics disturb the romance. Suddenly, Korean books and European translations are banned, confiscated and burned. All the beard bearing red robes at court are infuriated that "so many noble ladies ran away to find the love of their life after reading Maehwa's books" . But this is only a "just cause". The real target is "The Story of Hodam", a book about events that occurred twenty years earlier.

In their frenzy to search and destroy every single copy of this book, the king and councilor Min Ik-pyeong go so far as ask for the recruitment of female historians, with the intent of planting spies in each chamber of the Royal Palace. As a result, four female apprentices (Goo Hae-ryung among them) are selected and added to the existing eight recorders. They became part of the everyday collection of pieces 사책 that will be compiled into the Veritable Records of the Joseon Dynasty. Many gender stereotypes surface, only to be derided... and overcome. The twelve historians become embroiled in disputes with the Court, asserting their right under law to record all conversations between the royal family and courtiers, and even go on strike against the king.

A smallpox epidemic will be the event that reconnects the two storylines. On the one hand, members of the court speculate on traditional remedies, and even attempt to kill the Prince by sending him to the infested provinces. On the other hand, Dowon organizes the state answer, seizing and distributing food while applying the 牛痘種書, 瑛眼 (vaccination treaty, by Yeongan) that was provided by the mysterious Moh-wa. Hae-ryung remembers being vaccinated by her father in the past and convinces the Prince to prove the method by being the first patient to be inoculated.

Twenty years ago, Seoraewon
 A set of flash-backs disseminated all across the episodes describes the events of "twenty years ago". The former King, Yi Gyeom, Prince Huiyeong, styled Hodam, founded Seoraewon, together with Seo Mun-jik, styled Yeongan. The later was the dean, while Hodam was one of the teachers. The leading team was completed by Barthelemy Dominique, a medicine teacher, who was sent by the Paris Foreign Missions Society. As a result, Seoraewon was a school of Western studies aimed at educating people regardless of social class or gender. The Seoraewon name 曙來院 itself has the meaning of "Where Dawn Arrives".

This is where Moh-wa learned vaccination and surgery.

A conservative reaction ensued, led by Min Ik-pyeong. A forged letter of the King, allegedly saying "send more priests, and turn Joseon into a Catholic country"  served as "just cause"  for a massacre. Among the rare escapees were Dowon, the newborn son of Hodam and the 6 year-old Hae-ryung, the daughter of Yeongan.

The series ends three years after "nowadays". Min Ik-pyeong and his proxy king are gone and Seoraewon is reinstated. Prince Yi Jin is in charge of the throne. Dowon can live in leisure outside of the Palace, wandering across the world, while Hae-ryung becomes a full-ranked member of the Yemungwan. Prince Yi Rim (Dowon) and Hae-ryung are still in a relationship but not married.  They find time to travel together.

Quotation

(Goo Hae-ryung). "Even if you slash my throat, our brushes will not stop writing. If I die, another historian will take my place; if you kill that historian, another will take their place. Even if you kill every historian in this land, and take away all the paper and brushes, you won't be able to stop us. From mouth to mouth, teacher to student, elder to child, history will be told. That is the power of truth."

Cast

Main
In the Netflix release, the following three characters are put forward in the opening sequence of each episode: 
 Shin Se-kyung as Goo Hae-ryung (born Seo Hee-yeon)
A noble lady who becomes one of the four female historians of the royal court. She is the daughter of Seo Moon-jik, the deceased dean of Seoraewon, and has been living with her guardian Jae-kyeong whom she regards as her older brother. She is among those  Joseon women wanting to enforce their independence, moral and material as well, and to voice their ideas and opinions. As an historian, she is recognized as someone brave who does not fear anyone, even the King himself.  She often cracks jokes even in the most dire circumstances, for example when she is locked in jail.
 Cha Eun-woo as Yi Rim (Prince Dowon)
The first son of the dethroned King Huiyeong Yi Gyeom and the real heir to the throne. Not knowing his true lineage, he secretly works as a romance novelist under his nom de plume "Maehwa,". He does not involve himself in political matters, and regards his uncle King Yi Tae as his father and his cousin Crown Prince Yi Jin as his older brother. Spelled 島遠, Dowon means "Remote Island".  Until he meets Hae-ryung, Yi Rim leads a pathologically lonely existence.  She is his first and only friend.
 Park Ki-woong as Crown Prince Yi Jin 

 According to the credits, more than two hundred actors were involved. At the end of each episode, a recurring set of 34 actors is listed first,  followed by a list specific to the episode. Moreover, the Korean subtitles embedded in the Netflix release attribute each sentence to the corresponding character.

People around Hae-ryung
 Gong Jung-hwan as Goo Jae-kyeong
 Hae-ryung's guardian; former student of medicine and Mo-hwa's classmate in the Seoraewon. He forged the letter used as a "just cause" for the Seorawon's massacre.  Later, his remorse made him write the banned book The Story of Hodam.
 Yang Jo-a as Seol-geum
 Hae-ryung's caretaker and confidant.  She is a servant girl who lives vicariously through Hae-ryung's romantic adventures.
 Lee Kwan-hoon as Gak-soi

Royal household and court

 Kim Min-sang as King Hamyeong Yi Tae
 He reluctantly let Yi Rim live but is threatened by Yi Rim's superior claim to the throne.  From the beginning the King tries to neutralize Yi Rim as a rival, through sheer neglect.
 Choi Deok-moon as Left State Councillor Min Ik-pyeong 
 Kim Ye-rin as Crown Princess Min Woo-hee 
 Kim Yeo-jin as Queen Dowager Yim

People from the Office of Royal Decrees (Yemun-gwan)

The elders
 Lee Ji-hoon as Min Woo-won
 Heo Jeong-do as Yang Si-haeng
 Kang Hoon as Hyeon Kyeong-mook
 Nam Tae-woo as Son Gil-seung
 Yoon Jung-sub as Hwang Jang-goon
 Ji Gun-woo as Seong Seo-kwon
 Oh Hee-joon as Ahn Hong-ik
 Lee Jung-ha as Kimchi Guuk

The other three female apprentices
 Park Ji-hyun as Song Sa-hee
 Lee Ye-rim as Oh Eun-im
 Jang Yoo-bin as Heo Ah-ran

Others
 Jeon Ye-seo as Mo-hwa, a confidant of the Queen Dowager, skilled in archery, former student of medicine in the Seoraewon
 Sung Ji-ru as Heo Sam-bo, Prince Yi Rim's eunuch.  He gives some atrocious courtship tips to Yi Rim.
 Ryu Tae-ho as Song Jae-cheon, "M. Yes", father of Song Sa-hee
 Kim Yong-un as Gwi Jae, Min Ik-pyeong's handy man

Special appearances
 Seo Young-joo as Lee Seung-hoon : Hae-ryung husband-to-be, then magistrate of Songhwahyeon, E07
 Fabien Yoon as:
 Jean Baptiste Barthélemy - a beomnanseoin (French national) who came to Joseon to look for his older brother
 Dominique - Jean's deceased older brother; teacher of medicine in the Seoraewon
 Yoon Jong-hoon as Prince Huiyeong Yi Gyeom (a.k.a. Hodam)
The dethroned King and Prince Yi Rim's biological father
 Lee Seung-hyo as Seo Moon-jik (a.k.a. Yeongan)
Hae-ryung's biological father who was executed for treason charges 20 years ago. He was the dean of Seoraewon
 Lee Do-yeop as Shim Geum-yeol.
 Woo Mi-hwa as Go Hae-ryung’s teacher.

Production 
The drama's entire 13 billion won budget was financed by Netflix. Yeolhwajeong Pavilion—located in Ganggol Village, Deungnyang-myeon, Boseong County—is one of the filming locations of the series.

Original soundtrack

Part 1

Part 2

Part 3

Part 4

Part 5

Part 6

Viewership

Awards and nominations

Notes

References

External links
  
 
 
 

MBC TV television dramas
2019 South Korean television series debuts
2019 South Korean television series endings
South Korean historical television series
South Korean romance television series
Television series by Chorokbaem Media
Korean-language Netflix exclusive international distribution programming
Television series set in the Joseon dynasty